James Patrick Christian (born February 6, 1965), known professionally as Jim Christian, is an American college basketball coach who most recently served as the head coach of the Boston College men's basketball team. He previously held the same position at Kent State, TCU and Ohio.

On April 25, 2018, Christian signed a two-year contract extension to remain at Boston College through the 2021–22 season.  He was relieved of his duties on February 15, 2021.

Playing career

James Patrick Christian was born in Bethpage, New York. He was an all-state guard at St. Dominic High School in nearby Oyster Bay while playing under Ralph Willard, who later was the head coach at Western Kentucky, Pittsburgh, and Holy Cross. Following his prep career, Christian was recruited by coach Rick Pitino at Boston University where he played two seasons before transferring to the University of Rhode Island.  Both Willard and Pitino also attended St. Dominic High School.

Christian played his final two campaigns under Tom Penders at the University of Rhode Island, where he helped the Rams reach the Sweet Sixteen of the 1988 NCAA  tournament. The former standout guard guided the Rams to victories over Missouri and Syracuse before dropping a 73–72 decision to Duke in the Sweet 16 round.

After earning his bachelor's degree in consumer affairs from the University of Rhode Island in 1988, Christian spent one season playing professionally in the Australian Basketball Association for the Sydney City Comets.

Coaching career
After returning to the United States, Christian became the Western Kentucky University Hilltoppers' assistant coach under head coach Ralph Willard from 1990 to 1992. From there, Christian went on to assist head coaches Tom McConnell at Saint Francis University (1992–1994), Matt Kilcullen again at Western Kentucky University (1994–1995), Herb Sendek at Miami University (1995–1996), Ralph Willard at University of Pittsburgh (1996–1999), and Stan Heath at Kent State University (2001–2002).

Kent State
After assisting former head coach Stan Heath in the 2001–02 season, Christian became head coach at Kent State University from 2002 to 2008, where he led the Golden Flashes to six consecutive seasons of twenty or more wins, four MAC East division titles, two overall MAC titles, and two conference tournament championships.  His teams also had five post-season appearances, three in the NIT and two in the NCAA Tournament.  His record at Kent State was 137–59.

TCU
At Texas Christian University, Christian took over the position vacated by Neil Dougherty in March 2008. In Christian's final year coaching the Horned Frogs, he helped the program break a seven-year losing streak and gave them a bid in the College Basketball Invitational Tournament. The squad posted an 18–15 overall record, four more wins than in any season since 2004–05, and ended with its best finish ever in the Mountain West Conference at fifth place.

Ohio
On Tuesday, April 3, 2012, Christian was named the new head basketball coach at Ohio, becoming the program's 17th head coach, after former head coach John Groce left for Illinois.

In Christian's first year, the Ohio Bobcats shared the MAC regular season title with Akron with a conference record of 14–2, Ohio's first regular season title since 1994. Ohio earned themselves a No. 2 seed in the MAC tournament, where they beat Western Michigan 74–63. The following evening, Ohio lost to Akron 65–46 in the MAC Championships, losing a bid to the NCAA tournament. However, Ohio earned an at-large bid in the 2013 NIT tournament as a number 6 seed in the Alabama quadrant.

On April 3, 2014, Christian resigned his position at Ohio to become the head coach at Boston College, replacing Steve Donahue.

Boston College

On April 3, 2014, Jim Christian was named the Head Coach at Boston College. Under Christian, the Red Eagles saw little success, winning just 6 games in conference play in his first 3 seasons. They found some success in his fourth season, going 19-16, their best record since the 2010-2011 season. They also clinched an invitation to the NIT, their first postseason appearance since they went to the NCAA Tournament in 2009. That was however, the extent of their success under coach Christian as they finished with a losing record every other season. After starting the 2020-2021 season 3-13, Boston College fired Jim Christian as their head coach and named Scott Spinelli their interim coach. In 7 and a half seasons, Jim Christian was 78-132 overall, 26-94 in conference play.

Personal life
Christian and his wife, Patty, were married in the summer of 2005, and have three children, MacKenzie, Zach, and Jay.

Head coaching record

References

External links

 Boston College profile

1965 births
Living people
American expatriate basketball people in Australia
American men's basketball coaches
American men's basketball players
Basketball coaches from New York (state)
Basketball players from New York (state)
Boston College Eagles men's basketball coaches
Boston University Terriers men's basketball players
College men's basketball head coaches in the United States
Guards (basketball)
Kent State Golden Flashes men's basketball coaches
Miami RedHawks men's basketball coaches
Ohio Bobcats men's basketball coaches
People from Bethpage, New York
Pittsburgh Panthers men's basketball coaches
Rhode Island Rams men's basketball players
Saint Francis Red Flash men's basketball coaches
TCU Horned Frogs men's basketball coaches
Western Kentucky Hilltoppers basketball coaches